Velim, (Konkani: Velle), formerly Velliapura, is a large village situated in  Salcete, neighbouring Quepem taluka and falls under South Goa district, in the Indian coastal state of Goa. It has access to the Arabian Sea via the Sal river that flows through it and shares its borders with neighbouring villages/cities of Assolna, Ambelim and Cuncolim. The village consists of 22 hamlets or subdivisions that have been put together into 9 wards. As of 2020, the village has a total population of about 8600 residents residing in 2568 households. It is also a part of Velim Assembly constituency.

Etymology 
The word "Velim" derives from two words, "Vell" which translates to "shore" and "halli" which means "village", put together to form Velim, also known as village with a seashore.

Geography 

Demographics 
The village had a population of 5,955 residents of which 2,805 were males and 3,150 are females, making up to 1,536 families as per the Population Census 2011. The population is predominantly Roman catholics, with a small number of Hindus and Muslims. The people of Velim often refer to themselves as Vellikar or Velimcar.

History

Early history
World renowned historian, George M. Moraes wrote about the Velliapura (present-day Velim) family, in his book "Kadamba Kula, A History of Ancient and Mediaeval Karnataka". Jayakesi, the son of Shashtha-Deva, was a very powerful ruler  mentioned in a stone inscription of Kadamba King Jayakesi I, dated 1054 CE as Panajnakhani (present-day Panaji), giving him the epithet of Padavalendra which is Kannada for lord of the western ocean.

Twelfth century copper carvings reveal that princes and lords from neighbouring kingdoms traveled to Chandrapura (present-day Chandor), to pay homage to Kadamba Jayakesi, who was the sovereign of Konkan. "Velliapura Viragal " at 'Xavierian Research Centre tell that Jayakesi himself was in a battle with his rival to retain this place Velliapura won a decisive victory, which was his southern capital.

According to their resource after the 1266/1345, 16 October massacre the surviving Queen, Vinomaih devi, moved away from the furious Mohammedans in Chandrapura, and was taken into hiding in the Velliapura royal compound by the foothills of Velim. The inscription stones in Kannada found at Velim site tell that Suriya-Deva 1345CE slain-ed sovereign of Chandrapura, his Queen Vinomaih-devi  died and was cremated in Velliapura by her nephew Jayeshi, son of ShankaraDeva, grandson of Purandara Deva.

Portuguese period
According to a local legend, St. Francis Xavier visited the village before moving to Old Goa in the 1500s during the Portuguese India era for his missionary work and converted many locals into Christians. His missionary work was however looked down upon by the local blacksmiths who later drove him away. As of today, Francis Xavier is the patron saint of the Velim parish.

Village subdivisions/wards

The village wards include, Naik-Caiero, Silvas, Ubdando, Mascarenhas/Goleaband, Cumbeabhat/Paxel, Gorcomorod/Gorka-Moroda, Caroi, Sibrete, Tollecanto, Baradi/Bapsoro, Muxer , Pocklivoll/Khoroit, Rangalim/Zuem, Carxeta, Cutbona, Zaino/Olli-Zaino/Fondop.

Ward I

Ward I is a well developed ward, containing the village subdivisions, Naik-Caiero, Silvas and Ubdando; it shares its borders with neighbouring subdivisions, Cumbeabhat (part), Mascarenhas/Goleaband and Cumbeabhat/Paxel. It has an urban appearance and is home to the Velim village panchayat. Apart from residential areas, it includes a small housing complex, general market, stores, and a fish market, on a small scale.

The manufacturing and telecommunications hallmark in the ward can also be seen in the steel cupboard fabricating factory and the BSNL tower that's located at Naik-Caiero. One of the two catholic churches of the village, the St. Francis Xavier Church is located in the vicinity of the velim panchayat. It is also close to the diocesan affiliated high school bearing the same name and caters to students from first to tenth grade. The interspersed in the architectural framework of this ward are a significant number of coconut palms.

Ward II
Ward II is a hilly area, including village subdivisions Mascarenhas/Goleaband, Cumbeabhat (part), Cumbeabhat/Paxel; the ward consists of large forest cover and paddy fields that are interspersed with a number of houses. A consequential proportion of the tribal community of the Velim village are located in this ward. Cashew, mango, and coconut are the prominent large vegetation species to be found here. The appearance of wild seasonal mushrooms is also considerable.

Domesticated animals are kept as livestock and also used as dairy farming. Some of the freshwater fish that can be found here are thigur, chikole, and valaye. A large variety of wild fauna are found here, including various types of snakes, leopards, rabbits, foxes, and monkeys, as well as birds such as bulbuls, parrots, karate, cuckoos, etc.

Ward III
Ward III has a very noteworthy proportion of the tribal community of the village, which comprises 80% of the total population in the ward. The ward includes hilly areas with
forest cover, as well as cultivated agricultural fields that are interspersed with houses. The agricultural fields are used for the cultivation of paddy and vegetables. A notable number of coconut and banana plants can be spotted, and cashew is the most commonly occurring species within the forest cover. There are two freshwater springs that can be found in this ward.

The occurrence of wild mushrooms and a variety of medicinal plants are substantial. The fresh water fish includes tigur and goromb. Wild fauna like leopards, rabbits, foxes, monkeys; snakes such as cobra, python, rattle snake, russel's viper, and mandulpeshe; and birds like bulbul, parrot, karate, cuckoo, and peafowl are found here. There's also a canal that runs through this ward, which was constructed for the supply of water for irrigation purposes from the Salaulim Dam.

Government and politics
Velim is part of Velim Assembly constituency and South Goa Lok Sabha constituency.

Sports
The village has a playground located opposite to the St. Francis Xavier Church. It also has a sports complex, constructed by then Velim constituency MLA, Benjamin Silva, situated in Tollecanto, known as the Velim sports complex that shut its construction since 2017.

On 26 March 2022, The Director of Sports Authority of Goa, Vandana Rao assured to take appropriate actions on the ambitious project. The initiative was led by the current MLA of Velim constituency, Cruz Silva  who sent letters to the SAG director and other sports officials to direct the examination of the project, further ensuring that the infrastructure is put to use for the benefit of the local youth. He also suggested a possibility of having the sports complex host the FIFA U-17 Girls World cup.

The inspection revealed that the infrastructure was ready in all aspects with only the football ground pitches that were left incomplete. The director promised to place the proposal of the sports complex as a venue to host the 2022 FIFA U-17 Women's World Cup. Fr. Allan Travasso, the priest in charge of St. Rock Church, Tollecanto, stated that the director was thrilled to notice the sports complex with so many facilities and infrastructure. He also appreciated the work done by Benjamin Silva towards the sports complex and further stated that the complex should also become a community centre.

Notable people
 Antonio Piedade da Cruz, 20th-century painter and sculptor
 Ben Antao, writer, journalist, teacher, writer and certified financial planner
 Bonfilio D'Cruz, former director of education, government of Goa
 Braz Pinto, village chronicler
 Coly Col de Velim (Colin Crasto) Konkani tiatr director
 Comedian Selvy (Matheus Correia; 1974 –2022), Konkani comedian, actor, singer, playwright, director and producer
 Debbie Fernandes, village chronicler
 Dr. Antonio Xavier D'silva, medical practitioner 
 Dr. Sebastiao Mazarelo, first MLA of Cuncolim Assembly constituency and medical practitioner 
 Dr. Shivram Usgaonkar, medical practitioner
 Francis Braz, social activist and former president of AVC Lions Club
 Fr. Nevel Gracias (1964 – 2022), popular tiatrist known for lenten tiatrs.
 Jose Mario Vaz, former headmaster of St. Xaviers High School.
 Larita Fernandes, former deputy sarpanch
 Leander Paes, retired Indian professional Tennis player and politician
 Luis Mendes, freedom fighter and Goan nationalist 
 Melvyn Sanches, former sarpanch
 Roque Santana Fernandes, freedom fighter and former MLA of Cuncolim Assembly constituency
 Savio D'silva, South Goa Indian National Congress district president, former president of Cutbona Boat Owners Association and former sarpanch
 Savio Rodrigues, writer, journalist, environmentalist and politician
 Sushila Sawant Mendes, associate history professor at Goa Government College of Arts, Science, Quepem
 Vinay Tari, president of Cutbona Fisheries Co-operative Society
 Vece Paes, retired Indian field hockey player
 Wilson Benigno Duarte Mazarello, former footballer and medical practitioner

See also 
List of constituencies of the Goa Legislative Assembly

References

Citations

External links 

 St. Francis Xavier Church, Velim

Comunidades of Goa
Villages in South Goa district